Bewdley Bridge is a three-span masonry arch bridge over the River Severn at Bewdley, Worcestershire, designed by civil engineer Thomas Telford. The two side spans are each , with the central span . The central arch rises . Smaller flood arches on the bank bridge the towpath.

History
There has been a bridge at this location since 1447, each being destroyed and replaced. Severe flooding in 1795 destroyed the previous bridge. That bridge comprised five pointed stone arches. A stone gatehouse on one pier had been replaced with a stone cottage by the time of a 1781 print. One of the arches had also been damaged by the Royalists in 1644 and rebuilt in timber.

Parts of a fifteenth-century bridge were rediscovered in 2004 during excavations for new flood defences.

Thomas Telford designed the current bridge and was assisted by resident civil engineer,  M Davidson.  It was built in 1798 by Shrewsbury-based contractor John Simpson for £9,000. Its toll house was demolished in the 1960s.

The bridge was one of the main objectives of Oliver Cromwell, during the Battle of Worcester. Colonel Robert Lilburne, along with Major Mercer, 5 troops of Worcester Dragoons, Worcestershire horse and 2 troops of Colonel Rich's regiment were assigned to secure the bridge during the Battle.

See also 
 Crossings of the River Severn

References

Further reading 
Cragg, R., Civil Engineering Heritage - Wales & West Central England, Thomas Telford Publishing, 2nd edn., 1997, 
Witts, C., A Century of Bridges, River Severn Publications, 2nd edn., 1998,

External links
1814 engraving of the bridge
1823 painting of the bridge

Bridges across the River Severn
Bewdley
Bridges completed in 1798
Bridges by Thomas Telford
Bewdley
Former toll bridges in England
Grade I listed buildings in Worcestershire